Lieutenant General Timothy James Keating  is a former New Zealand Army officer and Chief of the New Zealand Defence Force. He was appointed Chief of Defence Force in 2014, immediately following his tenure as Vice Chief of Defence Force. He served as Chief of Army from 2011 to 2012.

Keating served as Commander, Crib Rotation 6, the Provincial Reconstruction Team, in the early years of the deployment to Bamiyan, Afghanistan.

Keating was promoted to lieutenant general and took over as Chief of Defence Force (CDF) for a three-year term on 1 February 2014. On 3 April 2018 Keating announced he would be stepping down as CDF on the completion of his term on 30 June. Keating did not give a reason for his resignation, but said he was not standing down due to the allegations about Operation Burnham in 2010 which was the subject of the book Hit & Run. Keating was succeeded as CDF by Air Marshal Kevin Short on 1 July 2018.

Honours
In the 2008 Queen's Birthday Honours, Keating was appointed a Member of the New Zealand Order of Merit. He was promoted to Companion of the New Zealand Order of Merit in the 2019 New Year Honours.

References

|-

|-

Commanders of the Legion of Merit
Living people
Companions of the New Zealand Order of Merit
New Zealand generals
New Zealand military personnel of the War in Afghanistan (2001–2021)
United States Army War College alumni
Year of birth missing (living people)